This page summarises the Australia national soccer team fixtures and results in 2014.

Summary
In their first full year under new coach Ange Postecoglou, the national team managed only one victory from eleven matches. The bulk of the matches were friendlies and included a 4–3 loss to Ecuador despite leading 3–0. Australia participated in the 2014 FIFA World Cup and were unable to proceed beyond the group stage after losing all three games.

Record

Match results

Friendlies

FIFA World Cup

Player statistics
Correct as of 18 November 2014 (v. ).
Numbers are listed by player's number in FIFA World Cup or last friendly played

References

External links
 Australia: Fixtures and Results

2014
Australia